ʿĀṣim ibn Thābit was one of the Ansar, a person belonging to one of the first generations of Muslims and who helped Muhammad after his migration to Medina.

Military campaigns during Muhammad's era

He participated in the Battle of Badr. Muhammad's forces included Abu Bakr, Umar, Ali, Hamza, Mus`ab ibn `Umair, Az-Zubair bin Al-'Awwam, Ammar ibn Yasir, and Abu Dharr al-Ghifari. The Muslims also brought seventy camels and two horses, meaning that they either had to walk or fit three to four men per camel. However, many early Muslim sources indicate that no serious fighting was expected, and the future Caliph Uthman stayed behind to care for his sick wife Ruqayyah, the daughter of Muhammad. Salman the Persian also could not join the battle, as he was still not a free man.

He also participated in the Invasion of Hamra al-Asad, After staying at Hamra al-Asad for three days, Muhammad returned to Medina. He captured Abu Azzah al-Jumahi as prisoner. Abu Azzah had previously been one of the prisoners of Badr. Abu Azzah Amr bin Abd Allah al-Jumahi had been treated kindly by Muhammad after the Battle of Badr, being a poor man with daughters, he had no means to pay ransom, he was released after Battle of Badr, on the condition that he would not take up arms against Muslims again. But he had broken his promise and participated in Battle of Uhud. He pleaded for mercy again, but Muhammad ordered him to be killed. Az-Zubair executed him, and in another version, Asim ibn Thabit.

The father of one of Umar's wives, Umm Kulthum bint Asim, was Asim ibn Thabit. It is not clear if that person is the same person as the subject of this article.

Asim ibn Thabit was killed during the Expedition of Al Raji. In 625   some men requested that Muhammad send instructors to teach them Islam, but the men were bribed by the two tribes of Khuzaymah who wanted revenge for the assassination of Khalid bin Sufyan by Muhammad's followers and they killed the Muslim's After killing Asim ibn Thabit, Hudhayl wanted to sell his head.

Hadith

See also
Asem, an Arabic name for males
Thabit, an Arabic name for males
List of battles of Muhammad
List of Sahabah

References

Sahabah who participated in the battle of Badr